Pudukad railway station (Station Code: PUK) falls between Ollur railway station and Nellayi railway station in the busy Shoranur–Cochin Harbour section in Thrissur district. Pudukad railway station is operated by the Chennai-headquartered Southern Railways of the Indian Railways. A total of twenty trains including all passenger trains and some express trains stop here.

References

Railway stations in Thrissur district
Thiruvananthapuram railway division